Jefferson City High School (JCHS) is a public secondary school in Jefferson City, Missouri. It is one of the five public high schools in Cole County and is one of two in Jefferson City.

History
The Jefferson City Public School District was established in 1838, but the first separate high school building was not built until 1905, with the creation of what is now the Simonsen 9th Grade Center. The current high school building opened on January 22, 1964 and houses 9th-12th graders.

Academics
Jefferson City High School serves approximately 1805 students grades 9-12. Jefferson City High School is designated as a high school by the Missouri Department of Elementary and Secondary Education. The school is accredited by the Missouri Department of Elementary and Secondary Education. Students may earn college credit from Lincoln University through approved courses on the JCHS campus during regular school hours.

Speech and Debate
As of the 2010-2011 school year, the Jefferson City Speech and Debate team is ranked 102nd among the National Forensic League's (NFL) 2,800 teams, placing it around the top three percent in the U.S  In November it ranked first in the Eastern Missouri NFL district, in which there are thirty schools total. In March 2011, the team qualified three students to the NFL national tournament and nine students to the Missouri State High School Activities Association state tournament.

Nichols Career Center 
Nichols Career Center, located on the campus of JCHS, is a career-readiness program which is application-only and accepts students from throughout mid-Missouri.

Alumni
 OG Anunoby: NBA player with the Toronto Raptors
 Matt Blunt: Governor of Missouri between 2005 and 2009
 Jim Dyck: former MLB player, St. Louis Browns, Cleveland Indians, Baltimore Orioles, Cincinnati Reds
 Justin Gage: former NFL football player, Chicago Bears, Tennessee Titans
 Kent Jones: comedy writer
 Neal Jones: actor
 Steve Martin: former NFL player
 Dennis Meyer: football player, Pittsburgh Steelers
 Justin Smith: former NFL football player, Cincinnati Bengals, San Francisco 49ers
 Charlie Weber: actor
 Sylvester Williams: NFL player
 Don Webb: former AFL player, Boston Patriots

References 

Buildings and structures in Jefferson City, Missouri
High schools in Cole County, Missouri
Public high schools in Missouri
1964 establishments in Missouri
Educational institutions established in 1964